Newton Thomas Sigel,  (born August 1955; sometimes credited as Tom Sigel) is an American cinematographer best known for his collaborations with director Bryan Singer on films like The Usual Suspects, Valkyrie, and the X-Men film franchise. He has also worked with filmmakers like Haskell Wexler, Mike Newell, David O. Russell, Terry Gilliam, Alan Ball, Robert Redford, and Nicolas Winding Refn. He is a BAFTA Award, Independent Spirit Award, Critics' Choice Award, and Satellite Award nominee.

Life and career 
Sigel was born in Detroit, Michigan, and studied painting in New York City, becoming an artist-in-residence at the Whitney Museum of American Art. He began his career working with experimental filmmaker Kenneth Anger as a camera operator. Becoming a documentary filmmaker, he shot a number of projects filming, including El Salvador: Another Vietnam, which was nominated for an Academy Award for Best Documentary Feature. His photography caught the attention of DP Haskell Wexler, and the two spent several years developing what would become the 1985 film Latino, his first feature film as director of photography.

Sigel worked mostly on television films and as a second unit DP throughout the 1980s before shooting the comedy film Rude Awakening. He regularly served under Robert Richardson on films like Platoon and The Doors. Starting with The Usual Suspects, he has become the regular cinematographer of director Bryan Singer.

Personal life 
Sigel is Jewish and married to Lisa Chang. His father, Irving Sigel, was a psychologist who worked for the Educational Testing Service. His mother, Roberta Sigel, was a professor at Rutgers who studied gender and politics. His brother, Ken, lives in Connecticut with his wife Sarah Kelly,

Filmography

Film

Additional photography credits

Television

Documentary films

References

External links

1955 births
American cinematographers
20th-century American Jews
Artists from Detroit
Living people
21st-century American Jews